The following is a list of notable Swiss people of Albanian descent.

History and politics 
Skënder Zogu –  Albanian author and member of the House of Zogu

Cinema 
Patrick Nuo –  Swiss recording artist and actor
Arben Biba –  Kosovar Albanian actor
Barış Arduç –  actor and model

Musicians 
Edita Abdieski –  Swiss pop singer
Elina Duni –  Albanian jazz singer and composer
Fortesa Hoti –  Swiss singer
Aurora Zeka –  Swiss-Albanian singer 
Loredana Zefi – Swiss-Albanian singer 
Ilira Gashi – Swiss-Albanian singer
Gjon's Tears  –   Swiss singer and songwriter who represented Switzerland in the Eurovision Song Contest 2020 and 2021
Florat  – Swiss-Albanian rapper and producer

Sports

Football 
Granit Xhaka – Swiss footballer who plays as a central midfielder for English club FC Arsenal
Xherdan Shaqiri – Swiss footballer
Taulant Xhaka – Albanian footballer
Berat Djimsiti – Swiss-Albanian footballer
Valon Behrami – Swiss footballer
Blerim Džemaili – Swiss footballer
Admir Mehmedi – Swiss footballer
Amir Abrashi – Swiss-Albanian footballer
Frédéric Veseli – Swiss-Albanian footballer
Eris Abedini – Swiss professional footballer
Arlind Ajeti – Albanian professional footballer
Albian Ajeti – Swiss professional footballer
Adonis Ajeti – Swiss-Albanian professional footballer
Eris Abedini – Swiss-Albanian professional footballer
Arijanet Muric – Swiss-Kosovar footballer
Shkëlzen Gashi – Swiss-Albanian footballer
Idriz Voca – Swiss-Kosovar footballer
Endoğan Adili – Swiss professional footballer
Shkelqim Demhasaj – Swiss-Kosovar footballer
Florian Kamberi – Swiss-Albanian footballer
Pajtim Kasami – Swiss-Albanian footballer
Benjamin Kololli – Swiss-Kosovar footballer
Hekuran Kryeziu – Swiss-Kosovar footballer
Mirlind Kryeziu – Swiss-Kosovar footballer
Migjen Basha – Albanian footballer
Vullnet Basha – Albanian footballer
Almen Abdi – Swiss-Kosovar footballer
Naser Aliji – Albanian footballer
Izer Aliu – Swiss-Albanian footballer
Albion Avdijaj – Swiss-Albanian footballer
Nedim Bajrami – Swiss-Albanian footballer
Mërgim Brahimi – Swiss-Albanian footballer
Imran Bunjaku – Swiss-Albanian footballer
Mërgim Fejzullahu – Swiss-Albanian footballer
Florent Hadergjonaj – Swiss-Albanian footballer
Andi Zeqiri – Swiss footballer
Arbenit Xhemajli – Swiss-Kosovar footballer
Shani Tarashaj – Swiss-Kosovar footballer
Arijan Qollaku – Swiss-Albanian footballer
Adrian Nikçi – Swiss footballer
Dilan Qela – Swiss footballer
Alban Pnishi – Swiss footballer
Orhan Mustafi – Swiss footballer
Liridon Mulaj – Swiss footballer
Jetmir Krasniqi – Swiss footballer
Orhan Ademi – Swiss footballer
Florijana Ismaili – Swiss football forward
Albert Bunjaku – Swiss-Kosovar footballer
Lavdrim Rexhepi – Swiss-Kosovar footballer
Valon Fazliu – Swiss-Kosovar footballer
Bastien Toma – Swiss-Albanian footballer
Cendrim Kameraj – Swiss-Albanian footballer
Mersim Asllani – Swiss-Albanian footballer
Milaim Rama – Swiss-Albanian footballer
Denis Markaj – Swiss-Albanian footballer
Beg Ferati – Swiss footballer
Bledian Krasniqi – Swiss footballer
Petrit Frrokaj – Swiss footballer
Tician Tushi – Swiss footballer
Ardon Jashari – Swiss footballer
Elis Isufi – Swiss footballer
Lavdim Zumberi – Swiss footballer

Boxing 
Xhavit Bajrami – Albanian-Swiss former kickboxer who competed in the heavyweight division
Shemsi Beqiri – Swiss kickboxer who competes in the middleweight division
Nuri Seferi – Swiss professional boxer

References 

Albanian